Miniso (stylized MINISO, メイソウ) is a Chinese low-cost retailer and variety store chain that specializes in household and consumer goods including cosmetics, stationery, toys, and kitchenware. Its headquarters are in Liwan District, Guangzhou under its Chinese holding company Aiyaya. In 2016, the company's sales revenue reached $1.5 billion. In March 2019, Miniso began a collaboration with Marvel Entertainment to sell its branded products.

Miniso has been criticized as a "copycat" for sharing an aesthetic similarity to Japanese variety stores such as Uniqlo, Muji and Daiso, as well as for being a Chinese retailer that markets itself as Japanese. Even so, Miniso has expanded outside of the Chinese market and operates 4,200 stores in Asia, Europe, Oceania, Africa, North America, and South America.

In summer 2022 the company announced it would decrease Japanese-inspired products and branding following anti-Japanese sentiment in China.

History
Miniso was founded in 2013 by Chinese entrepreneur Ye Guofu.  Miniso's first store opened in China in 2013. The company claims that Japanese designer Miyake Junya co-founded Miniso, although local media reports in China and Japan have questioned Junya's existence. The company initially claimed to be a famous Japanese brand, despite operating in Mainland China under Chinese company Aiyaya with no outlets in Japan, Miniso has since expanded outside of China and opened over a thousand stores worldwide.

In January 2017, Miniso announced that they were seeking to enter the North Korean market, opening their first store in Pyongyang four months later. According to The Economist, the store was popular among the country's wealthy but only accepted foreign currency, including the U.S. Dollar, Chinese Yuan, and Euro as payment. Soon after opening, the company's Japanese branch came under pressure for violating United Nations Security Council Resolution 2321 prohibiting trade with North Korea, distanced themselves from the move, and blamed the Chinese offices for the decision. As a result of the controversy, Miniso promised not to ship any more products to North Korea and the Pyongyang store was rebranded as "Evolution".

On December 18, 2018, Miniso filed for bankruptcy in Canada.

In August 2022 Miniso apologized for "wrong brand positioning and marketing" and said it would "de-Japanize" by March 2023.

Retail locations

Miniso first established a retail presence in China, and the majority of its stores still operate there. Even so, it has pursued an aggressive expansion plan in countries connected with China's One Belt One Road economic policy, alongside other similar international retailers like Mumuso, XIMIVOGUE, YOYOSO, USUPSO and LÄTT LIV, with shopping malls sometimes having several rival stores. It first began expanding in Asia: Taiwan, Hong Kong, Cambodia, Nepal, Macau, India, Pakistan, Mongolia, Kazakhstan, South Korea, North Korea, Indonesia, Malaysia, Singapore, Vietnam, Sri Lanka, the Philippines, Thailand and Bangladesh. Sales in one store in Vietnam on its opening day exceeded $10,000 in one hour. Miniso's store in Pyongyang was the first and only foreign-branded chain store in North Korea. It arrived in Australia in early 2017.

On 27 May 2016, Miniso opened its first store in Seacon Square Srinakarin, Bangkok Operating under the name of MiniSo (Thailand) Company Limited which Singtai Trading Company Limited is the sole importer. Currently, in Thailand, Miniso has a total of 52 branches nationwide.

In North America, Miniso currently operates several stores in Canada, the U.S., and Mexico. On August 6, 2016, Miniso signed a Comprehensive Strategic Cooperation Agreement with an American partner to expand its retail operations to the United States. The first U.S. store opened in Pasadena in April 2017.

In Central America, Miniso opened its first store in Panama. They had opened 4 stores by October 2018.

In South America, Miniso opened its first retail store in Brazil in August 2017, its second in Chile in December 2017, with plans to enter nearby Argentina soon. In May 2018, its first retail store in Peru was opened at Jockey Plaza Shopping Center. In Colombia it started operations with a double opening of two stores on August 30 in the city of Bogotá, by December 2018 they plan to open the first 15 stores in the country.

In Europe, Miniso operate retail outlets in Spain, Germany, Italy, Estonia, Serbia, Armenia and Russia, among others.

In Africa, Miniso first entered Morocco in early 2017 with 15 stores in multiple cities around the kingdom, South Africa in August 2017 and West Africa in Nigeria one month later. There are also stores in Kenya and in Kampala, Uganda.  As of January 2018, Miniso operates two stores in Egypt.

On August 1, 2018, Miniso opened the 1st store in Kuwait in the Avenues Mall Phase 4 (The Forum). On September 25, 2019, the 2nd store was opened in The Avenues Mall Phase 1. On March 3, 2021, the 3rd store was opened in Marina Mall. On July 7, 2022, the 4th store was opened in Souq Sharq Mall.

On September 1, 2018, Miniso opened two stores in Romania and plans to open 40 more stores nationwide.
Miniso has opened more than 70 franchises in Pakistan during past three years.
On January 12, 2018, Miniso opened its first store in Bangladesh.

In June 2019, Miniso announced it would open 6 more stores in Israel bringing the total to 18 by the end of the year.

On 8 November 2019, Miniso opened its first store in the United Kingdom in Ealing, a west London suburb. 

As of January 2020, Miniso has over 3,500 stores in 79 countries, with an approximate revenue of US$2.4 billion in 2019.

In May 2021, Miniso opened its first store in Porto, Portugal and they also announced that they will open more than 20 stores all over the country.

As of August 2021, Miniso has 4 stores in Oman, with 3 located in the capital Muscat and 1 store in Sohar.

Marketing
While Miniso is a Chinese company, its products are heavily influenced by Japanese design. Miniso's marketing strategy has been compared to Japanese retailers such as Muji and Uniqlo due to similarities in both store aesthetics, brand design, and inventory. Because of its Japanese-influenced branding strategy, the company's products have been criticized as "made in China to look Japanese", particularly when most of the company's stores are located in China, where people trust Japanese brands more than domestic offerings. It has also been criticized for affixing grammatically incorrect Japanese-language labels to many products, a consequence of using Baidu Translate to produce Japanese language copy, as admitted by Miniso's management.

Nevertheless, because of Miniso's success in expanding its number of retail stores, AllianceBernstein, a global asset management company, called its market strategy a success by "filling a price-point niche left unaddressed by the Japanese formats it was imitating".

IP collaborations, word-of-mouth, celebrity endorsements and the ability to launch viral products is at the basis of Miniso's success in China.

References

External links

 

Chinese companies established in 2013
Retail companies established in 2013

Companies based in Guangzhou
Retail companies of China
Variety stores
Chinese brands
Companies listed on the New York Stock Exchange
2020 initial public offerings
Companies that have filed for bankruptcy in Canada